Markell Davon Johnson (born August 25, 1998) is an American professional basketball player for BC Astana of the Kazakhstan Basketball Championship and the VTB United League. He played college basketball for the NC State Wolfpack.

High school career
Johnson played basketball for four years at East Technical High School in Cleveland, Ohio. As a freshman, he scored 27 points and made a game-winning jump shot with 3.1 seconds left against Lake High School to help his team reach its first state semifinal since 1972. He was considered one of the best freshman in Ohio. In his junior season, Johnson averaged 31.6 points, 7.4 rebounds and 3.5 steals per game, leading East Tech to its third straight league title and a district semifinal appearance. He was named Cleveland.com Boys Basketball Player of the Year and Northeast Lakes Division II All-District Player of the Year by the Associated Press (AP). On May 2, 2016, Johnson decided to reclassify to the 2016 class and forgo his senior year. On the Amateur Athletic Union (AAU) circuit, he played for the King James Shooting Stars, a team affiliated with NBA player LeBron James. Johnson was a four-star recruit and committed to play college basketball for NC State over offers from Louisville, Ohio State, Washington and West Virginia, among others.

College career
As a freshman, Johnson served as a backup to Dennis Smith Jr., who enrolled a year earlier than expected. He averaged 8.9 points and an Atlantic Coast Conference-leading 7.3 assists per game as a sophomore. On December 19, 2018, Johnson set career highs with 27 points and five three-pointers in a 78–71 upset of seventh-ranked Auburn. He missed three games as a junior with a back injury. Johnson averaged 12.6 points and 4.2 assists per game as a junior, shooting 42.2 percent from behind the arc. After the season he declared for the 2019 NBA draft but ultimately returned to NC State.

He injured his ankle in practice and missed the first game of his senior season, an overtime loss to Georgia Tech. Johnson hit a halfcourt buzzer beater to defeat UNC Greensboro 80–77 on December 15, 2019. On December 22, Johnson recorded a triple-double of 11 points, 10 rebounds and 10 assists in a 83–63 win over The Citadel. He became the third NC State player to ever achieve the feat, joining Dennis Smith Jr. and Julius Hodge. He was named ACC player of the week on December 23. Johnson scored a career-high 28 points and made a halfcourt shot in a 88–66 upset of sixth-ranked Duke on February 19, 2020. At the conclusion of the regular season, Johnson was selected to the Second Team All-ACC. As a senior, Johnson led the ACC in assists per game (6.8) while also averaging 12.8 points, 4.4 rebounds and 1.9 steals per game.

Professional career
On August 6, 2020, Johnson signed a two-year contract with Beşiktaş of the Turkish Basketball Super League (BSL).

In October 2021, he signed with Pieno žvaigždės Pasvalys of the Lithuanian Basketball League.

On July 5, 2022, he has signed with MHP Riesen Ludwigsburg of the Basketball Bundesliga (BBL). On August 23, 2022, he was released by his club, as he failed his medicals.

On November 19, 2022, he signed with BC Astana of the Kazakhstan Basketball Championship.

Career statistics

College

|-
| style="text-align:left;"| 2016–17
| style="text-align:left;"| NC State
| 30 || 3 || 20.4 || .377 || .250 || .577 || 1.6 || 2.3 || .9 || .3 || 4.0
|-
| style="text-align:left;"| 2017–18
| style="text-align:left;"| NC State
| 26 || 24 || 29.1 || .460 || .409 || .609 || 3.4 || 7.3 || 1.7 || .2 || 8.9
|-
| style="text-align:left;"| 2018–19
| style="text-align:left;"| NC State
| 33 || 30 || 25.3 || .488 || .422 || .747 || 2.6 || 4.2 || 1.1 || .2 || 12.6
|-
| style="text-align:left;"| 2019–20
| style="text-align:left;"| NC State
| 31 || 30 || 34.1 || .405 || .267 || .606 || 4.4 || 6.8 || 1.9 || .3 || 12.8
|- class="sortbottom"
| style="text-align:center;" colspan="2"| Career
| 120 || 87 || 27.2 || .437 || .344 || .646 || 3.0 || 5.1 || 1.4 || .3 || 9.7

References

External links
NC State Wolfpack bio

1998 births
Living people
American men's basketball players
Basketball players from Cleveland
BC Pieno žvaigždės players
Beşiktaş men's basketball players
NC State Wolfpack men's basketball players
Point guards